The Grand Duke's Finances is a 1934 German comedy film directed by Gustaf Gründgens and starring Viktor de Kowa, Hilde Weissner and Heinz Rühmann. It is a remake of the 1924 silent film of the same name by F. W. Murnau. The film was made at the Staaken Studios in Berlin while location shooting took place in Madeira and Tenerife. The film's sets were designed by the art director Franz Schroedter.

Plot 
Grand Duke Ramon, ruler of Abacco, is suffering from financial difficulties. He has already had to sell almost all his possessions. His biggest financier and creditor, the shady crook Mircovich, is already devising a devious plan to overthrow the duke, because he wants to rule the country himself.

However, when the American Bekker discovers underground sulfur deposits, the situation changes because he offers the duke a large sum in order to be able to mine the sulphur. However, the Duke refuses to accept the purchase offer. A short time later he had to resign because he no longer had any financial means. The situation is saved when the Duke marries the rich Russian Grand Duchess Diana.

Cast

References

Bibliography

External links 
 

1934 films
Films of Nazi Germany
1930s German-language films
Films directed by Gustaf Gründgens
Remakes of German films
Sound film remakes of silent films
Films based on Swedish novels
Films set in Europe
Films set in the Mediterranean Sea
Films set in the 1900s
1930s historical comedy films
German historical comedy films
German black-and-white films
Films shot at Staaken Studios
1930s German films